Leszek Szymowski (9 May 1981) is a Polish investigative journalist, photographer, traveller, author of the articles, documentary movies and books about behind the scenes of unknown political, international and economic scandals in eastern Europe countries. Author of many books and series of publications.

Early life and education
He graduated Warsaw University, the faculty of journalism and political sciences, and than East European Studies (specialisations: Russia and East Europe). He has PhD degree (MBA) from Warsaw School of Economics.

Career in journalism

Investigative journalism 
Since 2005 he has been publishing at newspapers in Poland including Wprost, and The Finance Weekly. 
Since 2007 he has been an investigative journalist of Angora weekly, where he revealed the biggest scandals: the behind the scenes of murder of police chief Marek Papała, the kidnapping of Krzysztof Olewnik, the economic scandals, the expansion of Gazprom and Russian mafia in Eastern Europe.
In 2011 he published in "Angora" weekly a serie of articles about CIA's secret prisons in Europe. After that, the Prosecutors Office wanted to accuse him for disclosure the state's secrecy, but finally didn't do it. The journalist claimed that the former polish General Prosecutor Zbigniew Ziobro was to be accused because of this scandal. Ziobro decided to accuse the journalist by private indictment, but finally lost in the court.

Investigative of 2010 Polish Air Force Tu-154 crash 
In 2011 he published the book "Attempt in Smolensk" (2010 Polish Air Force Tu-154 crash), which became bestseller in Poland (with the circulation of more than 100 000). He published unknown facts and concluded, that two explosions were the reason of aircraft and polish president Lech Kaczyński was murdered by russian and polish secret services, because he tried to prevent the new contract for gas supplies between Poland and Russia, which was unfavorable for Poland.

Works 
 (2011) "The forbidden history" (origin: Zakazana historia), co-authors: Jan Piński, Leszek Pietrzak, Rafał Przedmojski, Antoni Wręga, Dominik Smyrgała. 
 (2011) "The Attempt in Smolensk (org. "Zamach w Smoleńsku" (Publishing House), 
 (2011) "The empire of waste. Where our money disappear." (original. Imperium marnotrawstwa. Gdzie znikają nasze pieniadze) (Penelopa),  
 (2012) The agents of secret police against pope John Paul the Second (original: „Agenci SB kontra Jan Paweł II” (Penelopa), 
 (2012) "Medias and communist secret service" (original Media wobec bezpieki) (Bollinari Publishing House), 
 (2013) "The operation "Smolensk" (original:„Operacja Smoleńsk” (wyd. 3S Media),
 (2013) ""To kill the commendant" (orig. Zabić komendanta. Kulisy zabójstwa generała Marka Papały" (CapitalBook), 
 (2013) "The serial suicider" "Seryjny Samobójca" (Bollinari Publishing House),
 (2013) The matrimonial cheater" "Oszust matrymonialny" (Bollinari Publishing House),
 (2014) "HomoTerror" (Bollinari Publishing House), 
 (2014) "Poland hasn't died, we are alive" (original: „Polska nie zginęła… my żyjemy” – wywiad rzeka z Romualdem Szeremietiewem (Nobilis),
 (2015) "The forbidden investigation. How the investigation about the attempt on John Paul the Second was blocked" "Zakazane śledztwo. Jak torpedowano dochodzenie do prawdy o zamachu na Jana Pawła II" (Nobilis), 
 (2016) "The priest-killers" "Księżobójcy. Anatomia zbrodni" (Editions Spotkania),
 (2019) "The Entangled. NOn - authorised biography of Zbigniew Ziobro" (Nobilis Publishing House) 
 (2020)"Operation "The round table" (CapitalBook)

References

External links 

- Wprost articles of L. Szymowski

1981 births
Living people
Polish journalists
21st-century Polish writers
Writers from Warsaw